Parwan also spelled Parvan is one of the 34 provinces of Afghanistan. It has a population of about 751,000. The province is multi-ethnic and mostly rural society. The province is divided into ten districts. The town of Imam Abu Hanifa serves as the provincial capital. The province is located north of Kabul Province and south of Baghlan Province, west of Panjshir Province and Kapisa Province, and east of Maidan Wardak Province and Bamyan Province. The province famous tourism attraction is the Golghondi Hill, also known as “the flower hill,” is located in Imam Azam city of the ancient Parwan province about an hour away from the capital city of Kabul. After Panjshir this province has been considered as one of the main raising points of Afghanistan War against Soviets.

The name Parwan is also attributed to a town, the exact location of which is now unknown, that supposedly existed during prehistory, in the nearby Hindu Kush mountains.

Despite a four-decade-long state of war in Afghanistan, Parwan was relatively free of conflict by the mid-2010s. While occasional attacks on government or international forces were reported, they were usually minor. Such incidents in Parwan mostly involved grenade attacks on the residences of government officials or roadside bombs. Bagram Air Base, which was one of the largest US military bases in Afghanistan, is located in Parwan.

History

In 329 BC, Alexander the Great founded the settlement of Parwan as his Alexandria of the Caucasus. It was conquered by Arab Muslims in 792 AD. In 1221, the province was the site of the battle between the invading Mongols, led by Genghis Khan, and the Khwarezmian Empire led by Jalal ad-Din Mingburnu, where the Mongols were defeated. The famous Moroccan traveler and scholar, Ibn Battuta, visiting the area in 1333 write:

The area was subsequently ruled by the Timurids and Mughals until Ahmad Shah Durrani made it part of the Durrani Empire in 1747. In 1840, Parwan was the site of a major battle in the First Anglo-Afghan War where the invading British were defeated. Parwan's modern history began with the construction of a new textile factory in the town of Jabal Saraj in 1937. Parwan was involved in the Soviet–Afghan War as some of the fiercest fightings took place in the area. In the 1990s it was the site of heavy resistance against the Taliban.

Recent history

Since the removal of the Taliban in late 2001, the United States Armed Forces took control of Bagram Air Base and began using it as one of their main bases in Afghanistan. A Provincial Reconstruction Team (PRT) led by South Korea helped the locals with development activities in the province until 2014. In mid-February 2011, five rocket-propelled grenades hit the newly built South Korean military base housing the provincial reconstruction team and civilian aid workers. No one was injured in the attack, but it came hours after a visit by South Korean Defense Minister Kim Kwan-jin, raising suspicions of Taliban involvement. The opening ceremony of the base was postponed indefinitely.

A plan to build a power plant in the province is under consideration. A large portion of Parwan's economy relies on remittances from the Afghan diaspora living abroad.

In July 2012, the Taliban executed a married woman in front of a large crowd after she was found guilty of adultery. It was reported that the woman had a secret affair with a married military commander of the Afghan National Army. In August 2021, Parwan was captured by the Taliban during their offensive.

Healthcare

The percentage of households with clean drinking water fell from 32% in 2005 to 11% in 2011. The percentage of births attended to by a skilled birth attendant increased from 4% in 2005 to 7% in 2011.

Education

The overall literacy rate (6+ years of age) fell from 37% in 2005 to 28% in 2011. 
The overall net enrolment rate (6–13 years of age) increased from 42% in 2005 to 54% in 2011.

Demographics and geography

As of 2020, the total population of the province is about 751,000, which is multi-ethnic and mostly a rural society. 8 percent of the population lived below the national poverty line, the second lowest figure in Afghanistan behind only Logar Province.

According to the Naval Postgraduate School, the ethnic groups of the province are as follows: Tajiks, Hazaras, Uzbeks, Pashtuns, Kuchis and other minority groups. 
According to Afghanistan's Ministry of Rural Rehabilitation and Development:

Districts 
As per the figures below based on the ethnographics of each district as well as the density and therefore the inhabitability of each district, the province has a population of approximately 878,192.

Notable towns and villages 
Gulbahar, Afghanistan

Gallery

See also 
Provinces of Afghanistan
Battle of Parwan

References

External links

 , April 16, 2019, Ariana Television Network.
 Parwan Province by the Naval Postgraduate School
 Parwan Province by the Institute for the Study of War

 
Hazarajat
Provinces of Afghanistan
Provinces of the Islamic Republic of Afghanistan